Energy in Angola describes energy and electricity production, consumption and export from Angola. The energy policy of Angola reflects energy policy and the politics of Angola.

Biomass accounts for 58% of the country's energy consumption; oil accounts for 35%, gas 4% and hydroelectric power 3%.

Primary energy use in 2009 in Angola was 138 TWh and 7 TWh per million persons.

Angolans use to suffer frequent daily blackouts. In 2012, days before the election, the government announced $17B US in planned energy investment, designed to alleviate the paucity of available energy.

Overview

Angolan population has increased 19.4 percent in the five years 2004-2009.

Hydroelectricity
Electricity is produced by Empresa Nacional de Electricidade de Angola.

Crude oil
Angola ranks second in crude oil production in sub-Saharan Africa, after Nigeria. In 2022, the country produced an average of 1.165 million barrels of oil per day, according to its National Oil, Gas and Biofuel's Agency (ANPG).

Lobito refinery
Development has been planned but much delayed, of a new  refinery in the city of Lobito, on the coast. The Angolan state-owned oil company Sonangol would have a 70 percent stake in the Sonaref refinery at Lobito, its then-head Carlos Saturnino said in 2006, and the Chinese oil company Sinopec would retain the remainder.

Oil in the Angolan economy
Angola's economy was profoundly affected by the sharp drop in oil prices in 2014 and in 2020. This is even though new skyscrapers, appeared in Luanda; offices, shopping centres and apartment buildings proliferated in a "mini-golden age" as leading economist Alves da Rocha called it, from 2003-2008. Yet "probably three quarters" of the population of Luanda live in "tumbledown slums". Two thirds of the 16.5 million people in Angola live on less than $2 a day, according to the World Bank, and the oil industry employs less than one percent of the workforce.

Foreigners, including Chinese construction companies and several hundred thousand Chinese workers, and as many or more Portuguese and Brazilian trade and finance consultants and managers. Oil companies set up shop in Angola.

Natural gas
Angola LNG made its first shipment in June 2013. A system failure brought a design flaw to light in 2014, and production resumed only in 2015. In order to maintain the supply of gas to the facility, oil majors in Angola have formed a New Gas Consortium that took a final investment decision (FID) in 2022 on developing the Quiluma and Maboqueiro non-associated gas fields.

Environment

Oil spills in Angola
Angola fined Chevron Texaco $2m for causing environmental damage in 2002 to fisheries caused by obsolete tubes at the Cabinda oilfield. Chevron promised to spend $108 m replacing the pipes. The company pumps almost three-quarters of Angola's oil, and also reduced crude production about 12%, after a pipeline leak.

See also 

 Oil megaprojects (2011)
 Renewable energy by country

References